The 1952–53 FA Cup was the 72nd season of the world's oldest football cup competition, the Football Association Challenge Cup, commonly known as the FA Cup. Blackpool won the competition for the first time, beating Bolton Wanderers 4–3 in the final at Wembley.

Matches were scheduled to be played at the stadium of the team named first on the date specified for each round, which was always a Saturday. Some matches, however, might be rescheduled for other days if there were clashes with games for other competitions or the weather was inclement. If scores were level after 90 minutes had been played, a replay would take place at the stadium of the second-named team later the same week. If the replayed match was drawn further replays would be held until a winner was determined. If scores were level after 90 minutes had been played in a replay, a 30-minute period of extra time would be played.

Calendar

First round proper

At this stage clubs from the Football League Third Division North and South joined those non-league clubs having come through the qualifying rounds (except Walthamstow Avenue and Leyton who given byes to this round). Matches were scheduled to be played on Saturday, 22 November 1952. Fourteen were drawn and went to replays, with two of these going to second replays.

Second round proper
The matches were scheduled for Saturday, 6 December 1952, with Finchley and Crystal Palace competing instead on the 10th. Five matches were drawn, with replays taking place later the same week.

Third round proper
The 44 First and Second Division clubs entered the competition at this stage. The matches were scheduled for Saturday, 10 January 1953, although two matches were postponed until the mid-week fixtures. Six matches were drawn and went to replays.

Fourth round proper
The matches were scheduled for Saturday, 31 January 1953. Seven matches were drawn and went to replays, which were all played in the following midweek match. Two matches then went to a second replay, with the Chelsea–West Bromwich Albion game going to a third replay before it was settled.

Fifth Round Proper
The matches were scheduled for Saturday, 14 February 1953. The Blackpool–Southampton game went to a replay.

Sixth Round Proper
The four quarter-final ties were scheduled to be played on Saturday, 28 February 1953. The Birmingham City–Tottenham Hotspur game went to two replays before it was settled.

Semi-finals
The semi-final matches were played on Saturday, 21 March 1953. Blackpool and Bolton Wanderers won their ties to meet in the final at Wembley.

Final

The 1953 FA Cup Final, known as the "Matthews Final" due to Stanley Matthews' dribbling in the last 30 minutes of the game, was contested by Blackpool and Bolton Wanderers at Wembley. Blackpool won 4–3, with Stan Mortensen the first player to score a FA Cup Final hat-trick.

See also
FA Cup Final Results 1872—

References
Official site; fixtures and results service at TheFA.com
1952-53 FA Cup at rssf.com
1952-53 FA Cup at soccerbase.com

 
FA Cup seasons